"Always Right Behind You" is the first single from the album You Can Do Anything, the album from English rock band The Zutons. This is the band's 13th single. The track peaked as the band's ninth UK Top 40 single, peaking at #26 in the UK Singles Chart despite entering the chart at #28 via download sales alone the day before its physical release.

Track listing

CD1
 "Always Right Behind You"
 "That's the Cost"

CD2
 "Always Right Behind You"
 "You've Got to Move"
 "Valerie" (Dermot Session)
 "Always Right Behind You" (Video)

7" Version
 "Always Right Behind You"
 "Let's Work it Out"

Music video
The music video is of the band performing in a room with a band in the background swaying their instruments to the song.

References

2008 singles
The Zutons songs
2008 songs
Deltasonic singles
Songs written by Dave McCabe